Monsignor Hugh Francis Blunt (January 20, 1877 – March 22, 1957) was a Catholic priest, author, poet, and apologist. He was born in Medway, Massachusetts to Irish immigrants Sgt. Patrick Blunt and Ann Mahon. Blunt began writing while attending St. Laurent College in Montreal.

After his graduation in 1896, he attended St. John's Seminary in Brighton, Massachusetts in order to become a Catholic priest, and was ordained on December 20, 1901. He was appointed to churches in Stoneham, Dorchester, and Cambridge, Massachusetts, and did a great deal of writing over the course of his career. His most famous books include The Great Magdalens: Famous Women Who Returned to God Following a Life of Sin, The Great Penitents and Great Wives and Mothers, all of which are still in print. He also served as chief editorial writer for The Pilot newspaper and editor of the Sacred Heart Review.

Blunt had a strong interest in education and was known to be very strict. In a biography of former U.S. Speaker of the House of Representatives, Tip O'Neill, a story is told about how O'Neill and other children of the parish were warned by Blunt that they would be eternally damned if they visited the YMCA, since it was a Protestant institution. Blunt later performed O'Neill's wedding.

Blunt received the Marian Poetry Prize in 1919 and the Catholic Press Poetry Prize in 1929. In 1920, he was awarded an honorary doctorate by the University of Notre Dame for his contributions to Catholic literature.

Published works

References

Additional sources 
Paul R. Clancy and Shirley Elder, Tip: The Biography of Thomas P. O'Neill, Speaker of the House
John A. Farrell, Tip O'Neill and the Democratic Century
Paula M. Kane, Separatism and Subculture: Boston Catholicism, 1900-1920
J. Gordon Melton, Religious leaders of America: a biographical guide to founders and leaders
Francis O'Neill, Irish minstrels and musicians: with numerous dissertations on related subjects
John Drane and Piers Paul Read, The Gospel of St. John: the story of the Son of God
George E. Ryan, Figures in our Catholic History

1877 births
1955 deaths
American male non-fiction writers
American Roman Catholic priests
American Roman Catholic poets
Christian apologists
Roman Catholic writers
American expatriates in Canada